Acanthopleuribacter pedis is a Gram-negative, rod-shaped bacterium found in marine environments.

Acanthopleuribacter pedis is one of only two species of acidobacteria to have been isolated from animals.

Colonies on marine agar are circular, smooth and yellow in color. Acanthopleuribacter pedis are found on marine agar at a temperature of 15–30 °C (optimally at 30 °C), and grows at a pH of 5–9 (optimally at pH 7–8).

Etymology
The etymology of the genus is:  N.L. n. Acanthopleura, a genus of shellfish; N.L. masc. n. bacter, a rod; N.L. masc. n. Acanthopleuribacter, a rod from Acanthopleura, referring to the isolation of the first strain from the chiton Acanthopleura japonica.
The genus contains a single species namely A. pedis ( Fukunaga et al. 2008, sp. nov. (Type species of the genus).; L. gen. n. pedis, of the foot, referring to the isolation of the type strain from the foot of a chiton.)

Members of the phylum Acidobacteria are ubiquitous in various environments. Soil acidobacteria have been reported to present a variety of strategies for their success in terrestrial environments

References 

Acidobacteriota

Wang, Guanghua, et al. (2022). Comparative Genomics Reveal the Animal-Associated Features of the Acanthopleuribacteraceae Bacteria, and Description of Sulfitobacter corallicola gen. nov., sp., nov. Frontiers in microbiology. Vol.13, p.778535-778535. doi.org/10.3389/fmicb.2022.778535